Constituency NA-257 (Karachi-XIX) was a constituency for the National Assembly of Pakistan. It mainly represented the Airport and Ibrahim Hyderi subdivisions of Malir District. After the 2018 delimitations, these areas have been included in NA-237 (Malir-II) and NA-238 (Malir-III) respectively.

Election 2002 

General elections were held on 10 Oct 2002. Muhammad Shamim Siddiqui of Muttahida Qaumi Movement won by 45,480 votes.

Election 2008 

General elections were held on 18 Feb 2008. Sajid Ahmed of Muttahida Qaumi Movement won by 134,498 votes.

Election 2013 

General elections were held on 11 May 2013. Sajid Ahmed of Muttahida Qaumi Movement won by 125,405 votes and became the member of National Assembly.

References

External links 
Election result's official website

NA-257
Abolished National Assembly Constituencies of Pakistan